The International Photography Awards are a group of awards for professional, non-professional and student photographers on a global scale which are awarded annually at the Lucie Awards gala. The winners of the main categories are invited to attend the gala to compete for the main award of International Photographer of the Year, receiving a Lucie statue and a cash prize of $10,000.

History
The International Photography Awards were created by Hossein Farmani as part of the mission of the Lucie Foundation. They were initially presented in December 2003 at the Beverly Hilton Hotel in Los Angeles, California, at the Lucie Awards gala produced by Golden Globe nominee, Michelle Burstin.

In addition to honoring photographers, the Lucie Awards also showcase the finalists and winners of the International Photography Awards (Lucie Foundation's sister-effort) annual photography competition, presenting over $15,000 in cash prizes and two distinct titles: The International Photographer of the Year (given to a professional) and the Discovery of the Year (awarded to a non-professional).

In 2012, the Moving Image Photographer of the Year category was added, where six finalists competed to receive a Lucie statue and $2,500.

Annual ceremonies and honorees

2003 
The 2003 awards ceremony was the first, held at the International Ballroom of the Beverly Hilton Hotel in Los Angeles, California on December 7, 2003. 
International Photographer of the Year – Chris Frazer Smith 
Discovery of the Year – Robert Vizzini

2004 
The 2004 awards ceremony changed location and time of year, held at the American Airlines Theater in New York City on October 18, 2004. 
International Photographer of the Year – Timothy White 
Discovery of the Year – Marrigje De Maar

2005 
The 2005 awards ceremony was held at the American Airlines Theater in New York City on October 17, 2005. 
International Photographer of the Year – Jim Fiscus  
Discovery of the Year – Carol Watson

2006 
The 2006 awards ceremony was held at the American Airlines Theater in New York City on October 30, 2006. 
International Photographer of the Year – Gerd Ludwig 
Discovery of the Year – Ghada Khunji

2007 
The 2007 awards ceremony was held at the Avery Fisher Hall in the Lincoln Center in New York City on October 15, 2007. 
International Photographer of the Year – Massimo Mastrorillo
Discovery of the Year – Larry Louie 
Deeper Perspective of the Year – Charlie Crane

2008 
The 2008 awards ceremony was held at the Avery Fisher Hall in the Lincoln Center in New York City on October 30, 2008. 
International Photographer of the Year – Brent Stirton 
Discovery of the Year – John Delaney 
Deeper Perspective of the Year – Justin Maxon

2009 
The 2009 awards ceremony was held at the Alice Tully Hall at the Lincoln Center in New York City on October 19, 2009. 
International Photographer of the Year – Nadav Kander 
Discovery of the Year – Elliott Wilcox 
Deeper Perspective of the Year – Rachel Papo

2010 
The 2010 awards ceremony was held at the Alice Tully Hall at the Lincoln Center in New York City on October 27, 2010. 
International Photographer of the Year – Jim Krantz
Discovery of the Year – Kristina Kostadinova 
Deeper Perspective of the Year – Rodney Rascona

2011 
The 2011 awards ceremony was held at the Rose Theater, Jazz at the Lincoln Center in New York City on October 24, 2011. 
International Photographer of the Year – Majid Saeedi 
Discovery of the Year – Anna di Prospero
Deeper Perspective of the Year – Daniel Beltrá

2012 
The 2012 awards ceremony returned to its root, being held at the International Ballroom at the Beverly Hilton Hotel, the site of the first awards ceremony, in Los Angeles on October 8, 2012. 
Moving Image Photographer of the Year – Mark Bramley 
International Photographer of the Year – Alinka Echeverría 
Discovery of the Year – Viktoria Sorochinski 
Deeper Perspective of the Year – Fernando Moleres

2013
The 2013 awards ceremony was held at the Zankel Hall at Carnegie Hall, in New York City on October 27, 2013.

Moving Image Photographer of the Year – Carson Davis Brown
International Photographer of the Year – Brooks Kraft
Discovery of the Year – Carlotta Cardana
Deeper Perspective of the Year – Ebrahim Noroozi

2014
The Lucie Awards ceremony in 2014 was held at the Zankel Hall at Carnegie Hall, in New York City on November 22.

Moving Image Photographer of the Year – Yannick Wegner
International Photographer of the Year – Sandro Miller
Discovery of the Year – Vyacheslav Mishchenko
Deeper Perspective of the Year – K M Asad

2015
For the third year, the 2015 Awards ceremony was held at the Zankel Hall at Carnegie Hall, in New York City on October 27, 2015.

Moving Image Photographer of the Year – Kerry Payne Stailey
International Photographer of the Year – Maxim Dondyuk
Discovery of the Year – Ville Kansanen
Deeper Perspective of the Year – David Jay
Honorable Mention(s) of the Year – Haider Ali (haidertonight)

2016
The Lucie Awards in 2016, was held on October 23 at the Zankel Hall at Carnegie Hall, in New York City.

Moving Image Photographer of the Year -Lily Gilboy
International Photographer of the Year – Marinka Masséus
Discovery of the Year – David Nam Lip LEE
Deeper Perspective of the Year – Andrea Star Reese

2017
The 2017 edition of the Lucie Awards was held at the Zankel Hall at Carnegie Hall, in New York City on October 29, 2017.

Moving Image Photographer of the Year– Lebohang Kganye
International Photographer of the Year – Alex Telfer
Discovery of the Year – Mariano Belmar
Deeper Perspective of the Year – Giles Clarke

2018
The 2018 awards ceremony was held at the Zankel Hall at Carnegie Hall, in New York City on October 28, 2018.

International Photographer of the Year – Tawny Chatmon
Discovery of the Year – Mohammad Rakibul Hasan

First Place winners in different categories were:
Special – James Rushforth
Advertising, Sandro Miller
Book, Randal Ford
Architecture, Stephan Zirwes
Sports, Divyakant Solanki
Moving image, Emily Kassie
Deeper Perspective, Barry Salzman
People, Tawny Chatmon
Editorial, Rasmus Flindt Pedersen
Event, Mia Collis
Fine Art, Rodd Owen
Nature, Melissa Cormican

2019
The 18th Annual Lucie Awards were postponed and will be rescheduled.

International Photographer of the Year – Mustafa Hassona
Discovery of the Year – Mikkel Hørlyck 
Advertising Photographer Of the Year – Jonathan Knowles
Analog / Film Photographer Of the Year – Snezhana Von Büdingen
Architecture Photographer Of the Year – Evgeny Stetsko
Book Photographer Of the Year – Joey L.
Deeper Perspective Photographer Of the Year – K. M. Asad
Editorial / Press Photographer Of the Year – Mustafa Hassona
Event Photographer Of the Year – Sandro Miller
Fine Art Photographer Of the Year – David Knox
Nature Photographer Of the Year – Tom Putt
People Photographer Of the Year – Evgeny Stetsko
Special Photographer Of the Year – James Ritchie
Sports Photographer Of the Year – Kohei Ueno 
Still in Motion / Video Photographer Of the Year – Jean Bérard

2020

International Photographer of the Year – Julia Fullerton-Batten
Advertising Photographer Of the Year – Mike Dodd
Analog / Film Photographer Of the Year – Paulius Makauskas
Architecture Photographer Of the Year – Jesus M.Chamizo
Book Photographer Of the Year – Sebastian Copeland
Deeper Perspective Photographer Of the Year – Nicolo Filippo Rosso
Editorial / Press Photographer Of the Year – Kiran Ridley
Event Photographer Of the Year – Katja Ogrin
Fine Art Photographer Of the Year – Chloe Meynier
Nature Photographer Of the Year – Ari Rex
Nature and Astrophotography Of the Year – Gary W. Lopez
People Photographer Of the Year – Brian Hodges
Special Photographer Of the Year – Sawyer Russel
Sports Photographer Of the Year – Howard Schatz 
Still in Motion / Video Photographer Of the Year – Iwona Podlasinska

2021

Pro
Advertising Photographer Of the Year – John Huet
Analog / Film Photographer Of the Year – Angélique Boissière
Architecture Photographer Of the Year – Julia Anna Gospodarou
Book Photographer Of the Year – Delphine Blast
Deeper Perspective Photographer Of the Year – Bob Newman
Editorial / Press Photographer Of the Year – Mel D. Cole
Event Photographer Of the Year – Chong Kok Yew
Fine Art Photographer Of the Year – Mikael Owunna
Nature Photographer Of the Year – Liselotte Schuppers
People Photographer Of the Year – Art Streiber
Special Photographer Of the Year – Howard Schatz
Sports Photographer Of the Year – Andre Magarao
Still in Motion / Video Photographer Of the Year – Shilpa Narayanan
Nature and Astrophotography Of the Year – Gary W. Lopez
Non-pro
Advertising Photographer Of the Year – Antonio Coelho
Analog / Film Photographer Of the Year – Chris Round
Architecture Photographer Of the Year – César Cedano
Book Photographer Of the Year – Sue Park
Deeper Perspective Photographer Of the Year – Joanna Borowiee
Editorial / Press Photographer Of the Year – Sharwar Hussain
Event Photographer Of the Year – Brian Wotring
Fine Art Photographer Of the Year – Jiale Liu
Nature Photographer Of the Year – Javier Rupérez
People Photographer Of the Year – Elisa Miller
Special Photographer Of the Year – Bernd Schirmer
Sports Photographer Of the Year – Masatoshi Ujihara
Still in Motion / Video Photographer Of the Year – Aitor del Arco

References

External links

Photography awards
International art awards
Awards established in 2003
International awards